Belle Glade is a city in south-central Florida and it is the far western part of Palm Beach County, Florida, United States, on the southeastern shore of Lake Okeechobee. According to the 2020 U.S. Census, the city had a population of 16,698, down from 17,467 in the 2010 census.

Belle Glade (and the surrounding area) is sometimes referred to as "Muck City" due to the large quantity of muck, in which sugarcane grows, found in the area.  Despite being located in the South Florida region of the state, Belle Glade is culturally more associated with the Florida Heartland.

For a time during the early to mid 1980s, the city had the highest rate of AIDS infection per capita (37 cases in a population of roughly 19,000) in the United States. According to the FBI, in 2003, the city had the second highest violent crime rate in the country at 298 per 10,000 residents. In 2010, the Palm Beach County sheriff's office estimated that half of the young men in Belle Glade between the ages of 18 and 25 had felony convictions.

History

Origins 
The town of Belle Glade was founded during the Florida land boom of the 1920s. During that period, there were a series of efforts made to put in place drainage systems to reclaim dry land from the Everglades, including land around Lake Okeechobee. It was hoped that the reclaimed acreage could be put to better use, including agriculture. In 1921 the Florida legislature established an agricultural research station at Belle Glade to study methods of growing crops on reclaimed Everglades land. At that time, there were already 16 settlements on and around Lake Okeechobee, inhabited by around 2,000 people.

A settlement, originally named Hillsboro, was built at what is now Belle Glade in 1925. In 1926 the Florida East Coast Railway extended its system to Belle Glade, which helped the town's development.

1928 hurricane 
A powerful hurricane struck the area on September 16, 1928. The storm winds caused Lake Okeechobee to overflow its banks, inundating towns around the lake and causing widespread damage in Belle Glade. According to figures compiled by the Florida  Department of Health, the storm killed 611 people in Belle Glade alone, and a total of over 1,800 statewide. Contemporary accounts stated that most of the dead were Black migrant farmworkers, a "large percentage" of which were believed to be from the Bahamas. Belle Glade was rebuilt, and a large dike was erected to protect towns around the lake from storm-driven overflows.

World War II 
German prisoners of war were confined in camps located at Belle Glade and nearby Clewiston during World War II.

HIV/AIDS 
In the early 1980s, researchers began to notice a large number of people with AIDS in Belle Glade. The disease had first been identified by doctors in New York and California in 1981, and it was largely associated with communities of gay men in and around large cities. In Belle Glade, however, people with AIDS mainly identified as heterosexual, and around half were women. Some researchers, and notably Dr. Mark Whiteside and Dr. Carolyn MacLeod of the Institute of Tropical Medicine, in Miami, hypothesized that AIDS in Belle Glade might be connected to poverty and poor living conditions in the city's "colored town," where many people diagnosed with the disease also lived. Their theory, along with the very high per capita AIDS rate in Belle Glade, brought notoriety to the town as the "AIDS capital of the world."

Whiteside and MacLeod's theory turned out to be incorrect, but subsequent research conducted in Belle Glade shaped scientific knowledge about the transmission of HIV, the virus that causes AIDS, through heterosexual sex.

In recent years 
Today, the area around Lake Okeechobee is fertile and farming is an important industry. Sugar cane and vegetables are grown there.

Migrant farmworkers are an important part of the labor force. Belle Glade received national attention when a 1960 CBS television documentary, Harvest of Shame, graphically depicted the local migrant farmerworkers' daily existence and working conditions.
Men and women still gather around 5 a.m. in the same lot you see at the beginning of Harvest of Shame, waiting for buses to take them to the fields. The "loading ramp," as it's called, is a bleak, empty lot, surrounded by some small buildings with bars on the windows and a boarded up storefront.
As of May 2014 the city has plans "to demolish the loading ramp and turn it into a park."

The town is known for its football tradition, and together with nearby Pahokee has "sent at least 60 players to the National Football League".

Geography

Climate

Demographics

2020 census

As of the 2020 United States census, there were 16,698 people, 6,642 households, and 3,760 families residing in the city.

2010 census
As of the census of 2010, there were 6,368 households, out of which 11.3% were vacant. In 2000, 39.0% had children under the age of 18 living with them, 40.9% were married couples living together, 22.0% had a female householder with no husband present, and 29.3% were non-families. 23.3% of all households were made up of individuals, and 6.1% had someone living alone who was 65 years of age or older. The average household size was 3.04 and the average family size was 3.62.

2000 census
In 2000, the population was spread out, with 33.5% under the age of 18, 10.0% from 18 to 24, 27.1% from 25 to 44, 20.7% from 45 to 64, and 8.7% who were 65 years of age or older. The median age was 30 years. For every 100 females, there were 103.5 males. For every 100 females age 18 and over, there were 102.6 males.

In 2000, the median income for a household in the city was $22,715, and the median income for a family was $26,756. Males had a median income of $26,232 versus $21,410 for females. The per capita income for the city was $11,159. About 28.5% of families and 32.9% of the population were below the poverty line, including 41.1% of those under age 18 and 21.4% of those age 65 or over.

As of 2000, speakers of English as a first language accounted for 61.03% of all residents, while Spanish as a mother tongue consisted of 26.87%, Haitian Creole comprised 11.00%, and French made up 1.07% of the population.

As of 2000, Belle Glade had the tenth highest percentage of Haitian residents in the United States, at 11.50% of the populace. It also had the sixtieth highest percentage of Cuban residents nationally, at 5.98% of the population.

Economy

The cane sugar mill of the "Sugar Cane Growers Cooperative" (SCGC) is located at Belle Glade. During the crop season the factory employs 550 people.

As of Feb. 2013, the official unemployment rate was about 15%; however, the town's mayor suggested the actual unemployment rate was closer to 40%. The number of jobs available locally dropped as local agriculture shifted from vegetables to sugarcane, a more highly mechanized crop.

The United States Postal Service operates the Belle Glade Post Office.

The Florida Department of Corrections operated the Glades Correctional Institution in an unincorporated area in Palm Beach County near Belle Glade. It was founded in 1932, employed about 350, had a capacity of 918 inmates  and was scheduled for closure in December 2011.

Parks and recreation

The Lake Okeechobee Scenic Trail runs through Belle Glade.

Education
School District of Palm Beach County operates public schools.

Elementary schools
 Gove Elementary
 Belle Glade Elementary
 Glade View Elementary
 Pioneer Park Elementary
 Sellew Belle Glade Excel Charter School

Middle schools
 Lake Shore Middle School

High schools
 Glades Central High School

Private schools
 Glades Day School
 Lakeside Academy

College

 Palm Beach State College – Belle Glade Campus

Notable people

 Reidel Anthony, former NFL wide receiver, Tampa Bay Buccaneers
 Brad Banks, CFL quarterback, Winnipeg Blue Bombers; 2002 Heisman Trophy first runner-up for the University of Iowa
 Kelvin Benjamin, NFL wide receiver
 Travis Benjamin, NFL wide receiver and punt returner
 Rashaad Duncan, Former NFL Defensive Tackle for Tampa Bay, Buffalo Bills, Washington Redskins
 Jessie Hester, former NFL wide receiver, Los Angeles Raiders, Atlanta Falcons, Indianapolis Colts and Los Angeles/St. Louis Rams
 Santonio Holmes, NFL wide receiver, Pittsburgh Steelers, New York Jets, and Chicago Bears; Super Bowl XLIII MVP
 James Lee, NFL offensive lineman, Tampa Bay Buccaneers
 Barkevious Mingo, NFL linebacker, Arizona Cardinals
 Jimmy Moreland, NFL cornerback, Washington Football Team
 Louis Oliver, former NFL safety, Miami Dolphins and Cincinnati Bengals
 Fred Taylor, former NFL running back, Jacksonville Jaguars
 Deonte Thompson, NFL wide receiver
 Andre Waters, former NFL safety, Philadelphia Eagles and Arizona Cardinals
 Rhondy Weston, former NFL defensive lineman for the Dallas Cowboys, Tampa Bay Buccaneers and Cleveland Browns

In popular culture

In CBS Reports' 1960 program Harvest of Shame, Belle Glade plays a prominent role as a source of migrant agricultural labor.

The final scenes of the crime novel Pretty Little Things by Jilliane Hoffman take place in a sugarcane plantation near Belle Glade.

The high school football culture of Belle Glade is the subject of the non-fiction book, Muck City: Winning and Losing in Football's Forgotten Town by author Bryan Mealer.

The psychedelic pop band of Montreal released a track titled, "Belle Glade Missionaries" on their 2013 album, Lousy with Sylvianbriar.

In Zora Neale Hurston's novel Their Eyes Were Watching God, characters Janie and Tea Cake join other African American migrant workers in picking beans in Belle Glade.

See also
Eagle Academy (Belle Glade)

References

External links

Chamber of Commerce
         

Cities in Palm Beach County, Florida
Populated places established in 1925
Cities in Florida
Populated places on Lake Okeechobee
1925 establishments in Florida